Sira Sylla (born 14 March 1980) is a French politician of La République En Marche! (LREM) who served as a member of the French National Assembly from 2017 to 2022, representing the department of Seine-Maritime.

Political career
In parliament, Sylla served as member of the Committee on Foreign Affairs. In addition to her committee assignments, she was part of the parliamentary friendship groups with the Burundi, Rwanda, Senegal and Turkey. In July 2019, Sylla voted in favour of the French ratification of the European Union’s Comprehensive Economic and Trade Agreement (CETA) with Canada.

Sylla lost her seat in the 2022 French legislative election, coming in fourth place in the first round.

See also
 2017 French legislative election

References

1980 births
Living people
Deputies of the 15th National Assembly of the French Fifth Republic
La République En Marche! politicians
21st-century French women politicians
Politicians from Rouen
Women members of the National Assembly (France)
French people of Senegalese descent
Black French politicians
University of Rouen Normandy alumni
Members of Parliament for Seine-Maritime